Yu County, also known by its Chinese name Yuxian, is a county under the jurisdiction of the prefecture-level city of Zhangjiakou in northwestern Hebei province, China. Yuzhou is the county seat.

History

The area was home to the capital of the state of Dai during the Spring and Autumn Period of the Zhou Dynasty. Daixian also served as the capital of Dai Commandery, overseeing 11 or 13 counties in what is now northwestern Hebei and northeastern Shanxi. Under the Eastern Han, the commandery seat was moved west to Gaoliu (near present-day Yanggao in Shanxi). It returned to Daixian near present-day Yuzhou under the kingdom of Wei during the Three Kingdoms Period before the commandery was abolished in 388. (A separate Dai Commandery was established by the Northern Wei in the 520s, with its seat at Pingcheng, just northeast of present-day Datong in Shanxi.)

The city was a former garrison town during the Ming dynasty, serving as part of the defense system protecting the capital Beijing from Mongol invasion.

Administrative Divisions
Towns:
Yuzhou, Daiwangcheng, Xiheying, Jijiazhuang, Baile, Nuanquan, Nanliuzhuang, Beishuiquan, Taohua, Yangjuan, Songjiazhuang

Townships:
Xiagongcun Township, Nanyangzhuang Township, Baishu Township, Changning Township, Yongquanzhuang Township, Yangzhuangke Township, Nanlingzhuang Township, Chenjiawa Township, Huangmei Township, Baicaocunc Township, Caogoubu Township

Climate

Landmarks
Though seldom visited by tourists, the Old City (the earthen rampart walls of which remain in some spots) is home to numerous temples, including the well-preserved Caisheng Temple in honor of the Chinese money god. The restored city tower stands at the center of the old city.

Transportation
The county is accessible via bus from Beijing's Liuliqiao Bus Station.

See also 
Dashuhua

References

Citations

Bibliography

 .

County-level divisions of Hebei
Zhangjiakou